Canada has an active anti-nuclear movement, which includes major campaigning organisations like Greenpeace and the Sierra Club. Over 300 public interest groups across Canada have endorsed the mandate of the Campaign for Nuclear Phaseout (CNP). Some environmental organisations such as Energy Probe, the Pembina Institute and the Canadian Coalition for Nuclear Responsibility (CCNR) are reported to have developed considerable expertise on nuclear power and energy issues. There is also a long-standing tradition of indigenous opposition to uranium mining.

Emergence of the movement 
The anti-nuclear movement in Canada began as a part of the overall peace movement within Canada. The impetus for the anti-nuclear movement can be ascribed to the threat of nuclear arms during the Cold War, and the ineffectiveness of the United Nations in resolving the political tensions. As a result of numerous incidents and pressures, multiple notable groups were established in Canada to fulfill this purpose, including: the Canadian Committee for the Control of Radiation Hazards, the Voice of Women, and numerous student organizations in the country.

The first Canadian organization established centered around nuclear concerns was the ECCRH (Edmonton Committee for the Control of Radiation Hazards). This society was formed in 1958 by Mary Von Stolk. She was introduced to the anti-nuclear movement through a social connection to the American National Committee for a Sane Nuclear Policy. The purpose of the ECCRH wasn't the disarmament of nuclear weapons from the Canadian military, but rather they aimed to educate the public on the dangers of nuclear fallout produced by the usage of nuclear weapons.

The Edmonton Committee for the Control of Radiation Hazards later changed its name to the Canadian Committee for the Control of Radiation Hazards, to reflect its growing national following, as well as aspirations to influence federal policy. Von Stolk now aimed to persuade Diefenbaker to reject nuclear weapons for the Canadian forces, as well as bring awareness to the organization's original goal of bringing awareness to the effects of nuclear fallout.

In addition to the CCCRH (Canadian Committee for the Control of Radiation Hazards), the Voice of Women was founded shortly after the U-2 Affair. Lotta Dempsey, a columnist for the Toronto Star, called for the formation of a group to oppose nuclear arms in response to the aforementioned U-2 Affair. They sought to lobby directly against nuclear armaments by approaching politicians directly, and establishing grassroots connections with women in other nations. They received an endorsement from Mrs. Pearson, who was the wife of the leader of the Parliamentary opposition, Lester B. Pearson.

Context
According to a 2006 opinion poll commissioned by the BBC, 91 per cent
of Canadians surveyed were "concerned" or "very concerned" that "the way the world produces and uses energy is causing environmental problems, including climate change" and 85 per cent were concerned (or very concerned) "that energy shortages and prices will destabilize the world economy". In terms of available energy options which may help to address these problems:

...91% (of which 66% strongly) were in favour of "creating tax incentives to encourage the development and use of alternative energy sources, such as solar or wind power". Asked whether "building new nuclear power plants, to reduce reliance on oil and coal" would be a good idea, 52% agreed (of which 22% strongly) while 43% disagreed (of which 25% strongly).

International nuclear policy consultant Mycle Schneider has reported that, as of June 2007, the overall lifetime load factor of the 22 Canadian nuclear reactors was 68.5%, which is quite a poor performance by global standards. The CANDU reactors have "experienced a large number of technical problems, several of which had significant safety relevance".

Canada is the world's second largest producer of uranium (Kazakhstan is the largest producer, Canada was until 2008) and has therefore accumulated very large amounts of mine waste. This waste amounts to "several hundred million tonnes and about 400 million cubic meters of contaminated process water".

Algonquin tribe
Members of the Algonquin tribe have been peacefully blockading a uranium mining operation on their sacred lands north of Kingston, Ontario since June 29, 2007.

Other indigenous opposition against uranium mining has become a long-standing tradition, particularly in Saskatchewan.

Campaign for Nuclear Phaseout
The Campaign for Nuclear Phaseout (CNP) represents a coalition of Canadian public interest organizations concerned with the environmental impacts of nuclear power generation. CNP's mandate is supported by over 300 advocacy groups from across Canada.

In 2003, Campaign for Nuclear Phaseout commissioned the report Phasing Out Nuclear Power in Canada, which outlined a possible scenario where the central coal and nuclear plants in Ontario, Québec and New Brunswick could be phased out as they reach the end of their operational lifespan, to be replaced with a combination of more efficient energy use, expansion of combined heat and power technology, and deployment of renewable energy and distributed sources of power generation.

Canadian Coalition for Nuclear Responsibility
CCNR is a non-profit organization, federally incorporated since 1978. It conducts education and research on issues related to nuclear energy, whether civilian or military (including non-nuclear alternatives), especially those pertaining to Canada. Its president is Gordon Edwards.

Greenpeace Canada
Greenpeace Canada argues that nuclear power is an unacceptable risk to the environment and to humanity, and that the only solution is to halt the expansion of all nuclear power and to shut down existing plants.  Greenpeace Canada believes Canada needs an energy system that can combat climate change, based on renewable energy and energy efficiency.

Energy Probe
Energy Probe is a consumer and environmental research team, which is opposed to nuclear power, and dedicated to resource conservation, economic efficiency, and effective utility regulation. Founded in 1970 as a sister project of Pollution Probe and incorporated in 1980 as EPRF Energy Probe Research Foundation, Energy Probe led the opposition to Ontario Hydro's nuclear expansion plans starting in 1974. Energy Probe's plans to break up Ontario Hydro's monopoly and end support for nuclear power were endorsed in 1984 by the leaders of the Ontario Liberal Party and the Ontario New Democratic Party, the two opposition parties at the time. Later, the Ontario Conservative Party led by Mike Harris formally adopted Energy Probe's positions in its Common Sense Revolution.

Energy Quest 4 Nanticoke
Energy Quest 4 Nanticoke was formed to raise awareness on energy options for the Ontario regions of  Haldimand/Norfolk/Brant/Hamilton, as the county councils of Norfolk and Haldimand endorsed an Environmental Assessment on a nuclear reactor at Nanticoke without meaningful public debate.

Inter-Church Uranium Committee Educational Co-operative
The Inter-Church Uranium Committee Educational Co-operative (ICUCEC) is a church coalition that educates people about the nuclear industry in Saskatchewan and wants to halt all nuclear development in the province, including the mining of uranium.

Nuclear Free Great Lakes Campaign
The Nuclear Free Great Lakes Campaign consists of eight safe-energy organizations from Canada and the United States dedicated to the cessation of radioactive contamination of the Great Lakes Basin, and the removal of nuclear power from the area.

Peace River Environmental Society
Peace River Environmental Society fought Bruce Power's plans to build a nuclear power plant in northern Alberta. In December 2011, the company abandoned its plan to build up to four nuclear reactors that could produce 4,000 megawatts of electricity at a site 30 kilometres north of Peace River.

Pembina Institute
The Pembina Institute is a Canadian not-for-profit environmental policy research and education organization specializing in the fields of sustainable energy, community sustainability, global warming and corporate environmental management. Founded in 1985, the Institute has offices in Calgary, Edmonton, Vancouver, Ottawa and Toronto.  In 2006 the Institute released the report Nuclear Power in Canada: An Examination of Risks, Impacts and Sustainability.

Port Hope Community Health Concerns Committee
The Port Hope Community Health Concerns Committee (PHCHCC) is an incorporated nonprofit community organization which aims to produce a comprehensive independent health assessment about long term exposure to radioactive and heavy metal contaminants from sixty years of nuclear industry operations in Port Hope, Ontario.

Port Hope Families Against Radiation Exposure
The Port Hope Families Against Radiation Exposure group consists of 1570 concerned residents of Port Hope who are monitoring the activities of the nuclear industry, following a 16-month campaign against the plans of Cameco Corporation to  enrich uranium.

Safe and Green Energy Peterborough
In 2009, Safe and Green Energy Peterborough received $37,000 from a federal agency to review its study for the proposed Darlington Nuclear Power Plant expansion.

Save Our Saskatchewan
Save Our Saskatchewan is a group of local residents opposed to nuclear development in Saskatchewan.

Sierra Club of Canada
The Sierra Club of Canada has been active in Canada since 1963 and a national office was established in Ottawa in 1989. There are active chapters in every region of Canada, with offices in Ottawa, Victoria, Sydney, Corner Brook, Halifax, Edmonton, Montreal and Toronto.
The Sierra Club contends that despite over 50-years of development and government support in Canada, nuclear power continues to be plagued by cost overruns, technical problems, accidents and the ongoing difficulty of how to manage high-level nuclear waste.

See also

References

Further reading
Harding, Jim (2007). Canada's Deadly Secret: Saskatchewan Uranium and the Global Nuclear System.
Mehta, M.D. (2005). Risky Business: Nuclear Power and Public Protest in Canada. Lanham, MD: Lexington.
O'Connor, Ryan. (2015). The First Green Wave: Pollution Probe and the Origins of Environmental Activism in Ontario. Vancouver, BC: UBC Press.
Pembina Institute (2007). Clearing the Air About Nuclear Power
Pembina Institute (2007). Uranium Mining: Nuclear Power’s Dirty Secret

External links
Tritium leak protests prompt Canada to suspend discharges
Canadians join international plutonium protest
Canada's Nuclear Watchdog Says Minister Meddling, Globe Reports
Anti-nuclear activists begin battle for minds of Albertans
Sacking of nuclear official prompts row
Nuclear industry spins new mythology
Retired professor warns against pursuing nuclear power
Nuclear protest convoy dumps on Alberta reactor
MLAs table anti-nuclear petitions in legislature
Anti-nuclear groups take their message to legislature
Saskatchewan NDP fights nuclear power
"Where is my Electricity Coming From at this Hour? (if I lived in Ontario)" (Canadian Nuclear Society, with data from IESO)

Canada
Environment of Canada
Political movements in Canada
Nuclear energy in Canada
Protests in Canada
Environmental protests in Canada